is a former Japanese professional basketball player who played for the Akita Northern Happinets of the B.League in Japan.

Mizumachi was born in Imari, Saga Prefecture,  Japan and started playing basketball while in elementary school. After graduating from Gakushuin University in 2004 he decided to enter professional basketball, against his parents' wishes. He joined a team below Niigata Albirex BB's organization. In 2005 he was drafted by the Oita Heat Devils in the seventh round (26th overall) of the 2005 bj league draft. During three seasons with Oita he was named as a deputy captain, but was released at the end of the 2007-08 season. He was then signed by Niigata and spent two seasons with their bj league team.

In June 2010 Mizumachi was signed by the Happinets in the second round of the 2010 expansion draft and has served as captain throughout the club's seven seasons in the bj league. He was one of 12 players to participate in all eleven seasons of the bj league. He has remained with Akita following the team's entry into the B.League in September 2016, but has been replaced as captain by Shigehiro Taguchi.  His nickname is "Macho".

His retirement ceremony was held at the Akita Prefectural Gymnasium on April 3, 2019.

Career statistics

Regular season 

|-
| align="left" | 2005-06
| align="left" | Oita
|31||4||14||36.7%||25.0%||76.9%||1.4 ||1.4||0.5||0||2
|-
| align="left" | 2006-07
| align="left" | Oita
|22||7||12||43.6%||33.3%||0.0%||1.3 ||1.2||0.4||0||1.8
|-
| align="left" | 2007-08
| align="left" | Oita
|29||5||9||32.4%||0.0%||75.0%||1.2 ||0.9||0.3||0||1
|-
| align="left" | 2008-09
| align="left" | Niigata
|29||0||4||42.1%||11.1%||50.0%||0.7 ||0.2||0.3||0.1||0.7
|-
| align="left" | 2009-10
| align="left" | Niigata
|35||11||6||41.0%||50.0%||66.7%||0.8 ||0.6||0.4||0||1.2
|-
| align="left" | 2010-11
| align="left" | Akita
|50||45||29||33.2%||30.3%||59.2%||3.1 ||2.8||1.3||0||4.6
|-
| align="left" | 2011-12
| align="left" | Akita
|50||11||18||42.9%||33.8%||51.7%||1.9 ||1.6||0.8||0||3.5
|-
| align="left" | 2012-13
| align="left" | Akita
|44||13||7||46.9%||28.6%||66.7%||1.0 ||0.9||0.6||0||1.3
|-
| align="left" | 2013-14
| align="left" | Akita
|41||0||6.0||45.5%||28.6%||42.9%||0.3||0.7||0.5||0||1.2
|-
| align="left" | 2014-15
| align="left" | Akita
|50||13||13.2||47.1||26.5||66.7||1.0||1.5||0.5||0.1||2.7
|-
|-
| align="left" | 2015-16
| align="left" | Akita
|52||32||16.2||41.7||28.3||52.6||1.8||2.0||0.8||0.1||2.9
|-
|-
|style="background-color:#FFCCCC" align="left" | 2016-17
| align="left" | Akita
|45||2||10.4||25.0||0||50.0||0.8||0.7||0.4||0||0.8
|-
|-
| align="left" | 2017-18
| align="left" | Akita
|48||8||8.4||37.8||22.2||55.6||0.8||0.6||0.4||0||1.4
|-
|- class="sortbottom"
! style="text-align:center;" colspan=2| Career 
! 526||  ||  12.5|| 39.1||  27.9||  58.6|| 1.4|| 1.2|| 0.6|| 0.0||2.1

Playoffs 

|-
|style="text-align:left;"|2010-11
|style="text-align:left;"|Akita
| 2 ||   ||31.0  || .455 || .333 || .500 ||3.5 ||4.5 || 1.5|| 0.0 ||6.0
|-
|style="text-align:left;"|2011-12
|style="text-align:left;"|Akita
| 4 ||   ||14.5  || .500 || .800 || .000 ||1.0 ||1.3 || 0.5|| 0.0 ||3.0
|-
|style="text-align:left;"|2013-14
|style="text-align:left;"|Akita
| 3 || 0 ||4.00  || .667 || .000 || .000 ||1.0 ||0.33 || 0|| 0 ||1.33
|-
|style="text-align:left;"|2016-17
|style="text-align:left;"|Akita
| 1 || 0 ||  || .000 || .000 || .000 || 0 ||1.0 || 0|| 0 ||0
|-
|style="text-align:left;"|2017-18
|style="text-align:left;"|Akita
| 5 || 0 || 8.06 || .200 || .000 || 1.000 || 1.6 || 1.8 || 0.6 || 0 || 0.8
|-

References

External links

1981 births
Living people
Akita Northern Happinets players
Ehime Orange Vikings players
Gakushuin University alumni
Niigata Albirex BB players
Japanese men's basketball players
Sportspeople from Saga Prefecture
People from Imari, Saga